Nož or Nozh may refer to:

 , a Yugoslav film
 The Dagger (1999 film) (Nož), a Yugoslav film
 Nozh (explosive reactive armour)

See also
 Noz (disambiguation)
 Nož, žica, Srebrenica, a Serbian hate slogan